Little Milton (1934–2005) was an American R&B/blues singer and guitarist.

Little Milton may also refer to:
 Little Milton, Oxfordshire, a village in England
 Little Milton, Wollongong, a historic house in New South Wales, Australia

See also
 Milton (disambiguation)
 Little Mitton, Lancashire, England